The Reckless Lady is a 1926 American silent drama film directed by Howard Higgin and starring Belle Bennett, Lois Moran, James Kirkwood, and Lowell Sherman.

Plot
As described in a film magazine review, the attentions of Feodor, a Russian, to Mrs. Fleming results in her husband, Colonel Fleming, leaving her. The wife retains the child Sylvia. Years later Mrs. Fleming is gambling in Monte Carlo. Feodor reappears and makes love to Sylvia. The American Ralph Hillier was her other suiter. Mrs. Fleming attempts to commit suicide but is saved by Ralph and her husband. The Colonel pursues Feodor, who leaps over a cliff. The elder Fleming couple are reunited, and Sylvia accepts Ralph.

Cast
Belle Bennett as Mrs. Fleming
James Kirkwood as Colonel Fleming
Lois Moran as Sylvia Fleming
Lowell Sherman as Feodor
Ben Lyon as Ralph Hillier
Marcia Harris as Sophie
Charles Murray as Gendarme
Lucia Backus Seger as Fortune Teller
Barbara Barondess as Minor Role (uncredited)
Thomas Holding as Minor Role (uncredited)

Preservation
With no prints of The Reckless Lady located in any film archives, it is a lost film.

References

External links

Lantern slides: slide #1, slide #2, fold out herald

1926 films
Lost American films
American silent feature films
Films directed by Howard Higgin
First National Pictures films
American black-and-white films
Silent American drama films
1926 drama films
1926 lost films
Lost drama films
1920s American films